Roman Viktorovich Babichev (born 18 August 1975) is a former Russian professional footballer.

External links
 

1975 births
Sportspeople from Volgograd
Living people
Russian footballers
Association football midfielders
FC Energiya Volzhsky players
FC Olimpia Volgograd players
FC Tekstilshchik Kamyshin players
FC Smena Komsomolsk-na-Amure players
Kazakhstan Premier League players
Russian expatriate footballers
Expatriate footballers in Kazakhstan
Russian expatriate sportspeople in Kazakhstan